De Motu Antiquiora ("The Older Writings on Motion"), or simply De Motu, is Galileo Galilei's early written work on motion. It was written largely between 1589 and 1592, but was not published until 1687, after his death. It was never published during his lifetime due to a few uncertainties in his mathematics and certain parts of his understanding. Because it was never published during his life, he never composed a final draft. In the last parts of his work, the writing style changes from an essay to a dialogue between two people who strongly uphold his views.

By writing this book in the 16th century, Galileo was on the forefront of investigating the motion of falling bodies. In De Motu, he openly rejects Aristotle's views on the physics of motion and his astronomical views. Galileo opposes him with not only his opinion but with facts he has obtained based on experiment and on observation of celestial bodies.

It is unclear whether this book was initially made out to be a book in the form of a dialogue or a more conventional way of writing. The reason for this is that Galileo worked on this book for many years, creating multiple copies of each section. The version of this book that we have today is a compilation of the best versions each section. Some of these sections are in the form of a dialogue between two men, while other parts are not.

Summary 
The beginning of Galileo's work on De Motu compares the lightness or heaviness of lead and wood and how they fall compared to each other. He has an anti-Aristotelian view of this motion. He then goes on to demonstrate that objects that are equally as heavy as water will be completely submerged when put into water. But he argues that they will not sink or rise within the water. He goes on to say that objects that are lighter than the medium (water) do not sink, nor do they stay completely submerged. Lastly, objects that are heavier than water will sink. 

Later, he compares the size of two pieces of wood in water. He says that even though the bigger piece of wood does not sink as it would be thought it, it is compared to the amount of water under it that allows it to not sink like the smaller piece does not as well.

In chapter 7, he moves on to compare the swiftness and slowness of the natural motion of the mobiles. He says this happens in two ways. Either the mobile is the same but the medium is different, or the mobile is different but the medium is the same. Aristotle claimed that the two mobiles will fall at different times. The smaller being lighter will stay above the heavier and the bigger being heavier will stay under the lighter. That being said the heavier mobile will fall and land first. However, Galileo did not agree with this.

Galileo explains that objects that move downward according to how much heavier they are than the medium in which they are in. If an object is in a medium that is lighter than itself it will come to rest on the ground Galileo states that upward motion is unnatural because any object forced upward will change its course and continue downward to rest. He states that the point of any object is to move until it finds rest, that is his definition of natural motion. If an object changes its original motion, then its original motion was not natural.
 
Toward the end of the book, Galileo continues on his analysis about falling bodies and how objects in water specifically will sink to the bottom and why exactly his studies can prove such statements and why he discredits Aristotle and others before his time. Galileo also makes some interesting statements regarding fire and how fire is something lighter than air and it too will rise above the air. But, if there was an absence of air, Galileo claimed that it would sink down to the surface of the Earth and react in the same way as all other masses do.

See also
 Two New Sciences (Galileo's first published investigations of the motion of falling bodies)

References

External links
 Collection of Galileo Galilei's Manuscripts and Related Translations

1687 books
Books by Galileo Galilei
Historical physics publications
17th-century Latin books